Balal Arezou (also Belal or Bilal; born 28 December 1988) is an Afghan footballer who plays as a forward and is currently playing for Norwegian club IF Trauma. He is currently the all-time top scorer of the Afghanistan national football team with nine goals.

Club career

Asker
Arezou grew up in Afghanistan and moved to Norway as a refugee. In Norway, he played football for Senja, Grane, Arendal and Fredrikstad's youth team before he joined Asker in 2009.

Churchill Brothers
In February 2013 he joined Churchill Brothers S.C. on a four-month loan from Asker. His move completed with the return of Indian striker Sunil Chhetri from Sporting Clube de Portugal.

Moss FK
On 7 March 2015 he joined Moss FK on a 2-year contract. He will wear shirt number 90.

IF Trauma
Arezou signed with IF Trauma on 26 January 2019, and was reunited with his former coach, Gaute Haugenes.

International career
Arezou was included in Afghanistan's squad for the 2014 AFC Challenge Cup in the Maldives. In the group stages of the tournament Afghanistan claimed their first ever win at the AFC Challenge Cup with a 3–1 victory over Turkmenistan. After Afghanistan's 0–0 draw with Laos that confirmed their progression out of the group stage, an accident occurred while the Afghan players were being driven back to their hotel. Arezou sustained minor injuries in the accident along with his teammates Faisal Sakhizada, Ahmad Hatifi, Zohib Islam Amiri, and Mustafa Azadzoy. All five players were set to miss the semi finals against Palestine. Former coach Mohammad Yousef Kargar and current coach Erich Rutemöller also suffered minor injuries.

International goals
Scores and results list Afghanistan's goal tally first.

Club career stats

Honors
Churchill Brothers
 I-League 2013
Afghanistan
 2013 SAFF Championship
Individual
 2010 South Asian Games Top Scorer

References

External links
 
 
 

1988 births
Living people
Footballers from Kabul
Afghan refugees
Refugees in Norway
Afghan emigrants to Norway
Afghan men's footballers
Afghanistan international footballers
Association football forwards
Fredrikstad FK players
Asker Fotball players
Norwegian First Division players
Churchill Brothers FC Goa players
Expatriate footballers in India
Afghan expatriate sportspeople in India
Expatriate footballers in Norway
FK Arendal players
FK Senja players
South Asian Games silver medalists for Afghanistan
South Asian Games medalists in football